The Music Institute of Chicago, known informally as MIC (formerly the Music Center of the North Shore), is a nonprofit community music school in Illinois with campuses in Chicago, Downers Grove, Evanston, Lake Forest, Lincolnshire, and Winnetka.

Founded in 1931, MIC has expanded over the years to its current status as an institution serving more than two thousand students at seven campuses. The school's mission is to "lead people toward a lifelong engagement with music by providing widely accessible resources for high quality music teaching, performing, and service activities -- and harnessing the power of music to educate, inspire and bring comfort to the communities we serve." Resident artists and ensembles include the Neiweem Duo, Quintet Attacca, Tammy McCann and Fifth House Ensemble. Prominent faculty include Hans Jorgen Jensen, I-Hao Lee, Horacio Contreras, Abraham Stokman, and Roland and Almita Vamos.

An Academy program for highly gifted pre-college pianists and string players was founded in 2006. The Academy provides a comprehensive musical education for students who aspire to be professional musicians.

The Music Institute of Chicago (then known as the School of Musical Arts and Crafts) was founded in 1931 by David and Dorothy Dushkin. The Dushkins met in Paris as students of Nadia Boulanger. Each had taught for two years in the Chicago area before establishing their own school. David taught instrumental music at Francis Parker, the Latin School and in the Glencoe Public Schools; Dorothy was a vocal teacher at the Latin School.

The Dushkins were passionate in their love of music, and wanted to make that love a part of the everyday life of as many children as they could reach. They were devoted, not to the training of the professional musician (although many who began their studies with the Dushkins went on to professional careers), but to developing musical ability and appreciation in the lifelong amateur.

David was a strong advocate for the creation of musical instruments. He believed instrument making worked as a powerful stimulus to musical education, teaching the student pitch and tone and a love for the instrument itself. The Dushkin home in Winnetka served as a complete instrument workshop. Before their lessons began, students would spend an hour or two in the shop working under David’s tutelage.

After two years, due to growing popularity and enrollment, a new school was built at 555 Glendale and renamed the Winnetka Music School. It housed a concert hall on the main floor, a workshop and studios below and living quarters on the upper level. Noteworthy faculty included Grace Nash, violin; Genevieve Lewis, cello; and Louise Burge, flute. With the assistance of Harrison Collins, principal at Sunset Ridge School in Northfield, a special relationship developed with the Winnetka community, and particularly the Winnetka Public Schools. Teachers from the Winnetka Music School were able to give lessons at Sunset Ridge during the school day. In addition, many musical performances were presented for the community, including one by composer Igor Stravinsky and violinist Samuel Dushkin.

For 22 years the Dushkins remained very much part of the community until they decided to move to Vermont and establish a summer music school that became known as Kinhaven. A small group of passionate citizens, led by faculty violinist Grace Nash, Richard D. Colburn and Lucy Montgomery envisioned a higher profile for the Winnetka Community School and purchased it from the Dushkins. Herbert Zipper was recruited to be the first president of the renamed Music Center of the North Shore. Zipper was an accomplished conductor and composer whose remarkable journey included imprisonment in Dachau and Buchenwald. He later reorganized and conducted the Manila Symphony after the end of World War II. Zipper had moved to New York to take up his work as the first executive director of the National Guild of Community Music Schools. When he arrived in Winnetka in 1953, Zipper was poised to establish the Music Center of the North Shore as a modern community music school that combined professional performances with high-quality education and training for the younger generation.

In 1956, Richard D. Colburn further propelled his vision by spearheading a group that garnered the necessary resources to build a new music facility on land leased from North Shore Country Day School. This would become the exclusive home of the Music Center of the North Shore for many years to come. Several significant and innovative programs were adopted and nurtured in the ensuing decades, including Orff Schulwerk and the public school-touring Philharmonia ensemble known informally as the Zipper Orchestra. After 14 years as director of the Music Center, and having virtually re-invented the concept of a community music school, Zipper resigned to take the post of special assistant to the Dean of the University of California School of Performing Arts. Programs developed by Zipper in California eventually evolved into the renowned Colburn Academy.

The Music Institute expanded into Evanston in the 1980s and purchased and renovated the former First Church Christ, Scientist on Chicago Avenue. The Institute later merged with two other community schools, Music Arts School and Lake Forest Symphony School.

References

External links
Music Institute of Chicago website

Music schools in Illinois
Schools in Evanston, Illinois